Simon Herbert (born 26 August 2001 in Leicester) is an English professional squash player. As of October 2021, he was ranked number 190 in the world. He won the 2021 Cheam Classic.

References

2001 births
Living people
English male squash players